Sai Suthar is a Hindu artisan community from India.  The name of the community derives from the main occupation of the community of a tailor -sai and carpenter - suthar. They are included in other backward class of Gujarat. They are also among one the other backward castes of Maharashtra. They are classified as a sub-caste of Shimpis in Maharashtra. Outside Gujarat and Maharshtra, they have notable diaspora in Chhattisgarh. Many members of the community are followers of Sitaram Bapa, also known as Bajrangdas Bapa, of Bagdana.

References

Social groups of Gujarat
Social groups of Maharashtra
Indian castes
Other Backward Classes
Hindu communities